Eucalyptus froggattii, commonly known as the Kamarooka mallee, is a species of mallee or small tree that is endemic to Victoria. It has rough, crumbly, blackish bark on the trunk, smooth grey to brown bark above, lance-shaped adult leaves, four-sided flower buds in groups of between seven and eleven, white or cream-coloured flowers and four-sided, cup-shaped to pear-shaped fruit.

Description
It has rough, crumbly blackish bark on the trunk, smooth grey to brown bark that is shed in ribbons above.

Taxonomy and naming
Eucalyptus froggattii was first formally described in 1934 by William Blakely from a specimen collected at Kamarooka near Bendigo by Alfred Howitt, and the description was published in Blakely's book A Key to the Eucalypts. The specific epithet (foggattii) honours the entomologist, Walter Wilson Froggatt.

Distribution and habitat
Kamarooka mallee is usually only found in remnant woodland or shrubland in farmlands between Horsham, Bendigo, Charlton and Nhill in Victoria, but some populations are conserved in the Kamarooka State Park (now part of the Greater Bendigo National Park) and in flora reserves such as the Wychitella Nature Conservation Reserve and Mount Arapiles-Tooan State Park.

See also
List of Eucalyptus species

References

Flora of Victoria (Australia)
Trees of Australia
froggattii
Myrtales of Australia
Plants described in 1934
Taxa named by William Blakely